Stanisławów may refer to:

Places

Poland

Former Polish territory
Stanisławów Voivodeship, formerly in Poland, now mostly in Ukraine
Ivano-Frankivsk, formerly Stanisławów, administrative centre

Central Poland
Stanisławów, Gmina Kutno, in Łódź Voivodeship (central Poland)
Stanisławów, Gmina Oporów, in Łódź Voivodeship (central Poland)
Stanisławów, Łask County, in Łódź Voivodeship (central Poland)
Stanisławów, Opoczno County, in Łódź Voivodeship (central Poland)
Stanisławów, Pajęczno County, in Łódź Voivodeship (central Poland)
Stanisławów, Gmina Łęki Szlacheckie, in Łódź Voivodeship (central Poland)
Stanisławów, Gmina Wolbórz, in Łódź Voivodeship (central Poland)
Stanisławów, Poddębice County, in Łódź Voivodeship (central Poland)
Stanisławów, Rawa County, in Łódź Voivodeship (central Poland)
Stanisławów, Sieradz County, in Łódź Voivodeship (central Poland)
Stanisławów, Tomaszów Mazowiecki County, in Łódź Voivodeship (central Poland)
Stanisławów, Gmina Żelechlinek, in Łódź Voivodeship (central Poland)
Stanisławów, Wieluń County, in Łódź Voivodeship (central Poland)
 Stanisławów Lipski, in Tomaszów Mazowiecki County, Łódź Voivodeship (central Poland)
 Stanisławów Nowy, in Pabianice County, Łódź Voivodeship (central Poland)
 Stanisławów Stary, in Pabianice County, Łódź Voivodeship (central Poland)
 Stanisławów Studziński, in Tomaszów Mazowiecki County, Łódź Voivodeship (central Poland)

Eastern Poland
Stanisławów, Biłgoraj County, in Lublin Voivodeship (east Poland)
Stanisławów, Chełm County, in Lublin Voivodeship (east Poland)
Stanisławów, Opole Lubelskie County, in Lublin Voivodeship (east Poland)
Stanisławów, Radzyń Podlaski County, in Lublin Voivodeship (east Poland)
Stanisławów, Włodawa County, in Lublin Voivodeship (east Poland)
 Stanisławów Duży, in Lubartów County, Lublin Voivodeship (east Poland)
Stanisławów, Białobrzegi County, in Masovian Voivodeship (east-central Poland)
Stanisławów, Gostynin County, in Masovian Voivodeship (east-central Poland)
Stanisławów, Grodzisk Mazowiecki County, in Masovian Voivodeship (east-central Poland)
Stanisławów, Kozienice County, in Masovian Voivodeship (east-central Poland)
Stanisławów, Mińsk County, in Masovian Voivodeship (east-central Poland)
Stanisławów, Nowy Dwór Mazowiecki County, in Masovian Voivodeship (east-central Poland)
Stanisławów, Przysucha County, in Masovian Voivodeship (east-central Poland)
Stanisławów, Radom County, in Masovian Voivodeship (east-central Poland)
Stanisławów, Gmina Chlewiska, in Masovian Voivodeship (east-central Poland)
Stanisławów, Warsaw West County, in Masovian Voivodeship (east-central Poland)
Stanisławów, Wołomin County, in Masovian Voivodeship (east-central Poland)
Stanisławów, Zwoleń County, in Masovian Voivodeship (east-central Poland)
 Gmina Stanisławów, in Mińsk County, Masovian Voivodeship (east-central Poland)
 Mały Stanisławów
 Kolonie Stanisławów
 Stanisławów Skrzański, in Gostynin County, Masovian Voivodeship (east-central Poland)

Southern Poland
Stanisławów, Świętokrzyskie Voivodeship (south-central Poland)
Stanisławów, Częstochowa County, in Silesian Voivodeship (south Poland)
Stanisławów, Kłobuck County, in Silesian Voivodeship (south Poland)
Stanisławów, Lower Silesian Voivodeship (south-west Poland)

Western Poland
Stanisławów, Greater Poland Voivodeship (west-central Poland)
Stanisławów, Koło County, in Greater Poland Voivodeship (west-central Poland)

Other uses 
Rewera Stanisławów, a Polish football team
Stanisławów District League

See also
 
 Stanislav (disambiguation)
 Stanisławowo (disambiguation)
 Stanisławski